Vetterli may refer to:

Vetterli rifle, series of Swiss Army service rifles
M1870 Italian Vetterli, Italian service rifle
Martin Vetterli (born 1957), Swiss electrical engineering academic